Brenda Silsbe (born 1953) is a Canadian children's writer.

Background
Brenda Silsbe (née Taft) was born October 10, 1953 in Terrace, British Columbia, Canada. In 1977 she received a Bachelor of Education degree from the University of British Columbia and returned to Terrace to teach primary school.  Silsbe had her first work of children's fiction published in 1989 by Annick Press.

Published works
 The Bears We Know (Annikin), illustrations by Scot Ritchie (Annick Press, 1989) 
 Just One More Colour, illustrations by Shawn Steffler (Annick Press, 1991)  (bound)  (pbk.)
 Winning the Girl of the Sea, illustrations by Alice Priestley (Annick Press, 1994)  (trade)  (lib. bdg.)
 The Watcher, illustrations by Alice Priestley (Annick Press, 1995)  (bound)  (pbk.)
 W. Haigh, Animal Poet (ITP Nelson, 1998) 
 The Duet, illustrations by Galan Akin (Hodgepog Books, 2000) 
 A tree is just a tree?, illustrations by Yayo (Lobster Press, 2001) 
 The Bears We Know, illustrations by Vlasta van Kampen (Annick Press, 2009)  (bound)  (pbk.)

References

1953 births
Canadian children's writers
Living people
People from Terrace, British Columbia
Canadian women children's writers